Dimitriou or Demetriou is a Greek patronymic surname, meaning "child of Demetrios". Notable people with the surname include:

Andreas Demetriou (born 1950) Greek Cypriot developmental psychologist and a former Minister of Education and Culture of Cyprus
Andrew Demetriou (born 1961), chief executive officer of the Australian Football League
Angela Dimitriou (born 1954), Greek pop folk singer
Christos Demetriou, musician, songwriter, record producer and entrepreneur
Cleo Demetriou (born 2001), stage actress
Harriet Demetriou, Filipino lawyer and first Chairwoman of the Philippine election commission, the COMELEC
Harry Demetriou (born 1958), British poker player
Ioannis Dimitriou (1826-c.1900), Greek archaeologist and merchant
Jamie Demetriou (born c.1987), actor and writer
Jason Demetriou (rugby league) (born 1976), Australian born Canadian/Greek rugby league footballer and coach
Jason Demetriou (footballer) (born 1987), is an English-born Cypriot footballer who plays for Anorthosis Famagusta
Kyriacos Demetriou (1919 - 1999), New York City barber
Michael Demetriou, American aerospace engineer
Michalis Demetriou (born 1986), Cypriot footballer playing for Nea Salamina FC
Mickey Demetriou (born 1990), English footballer 
Natasia Demetriou (born 1983/84), English comedian
Panayiotis Demetriou (born 1939) Cypriot politician and Member of the European Parliament for the European People's Party

Greek-language surnames
Surnames
Patronymic surnames
Surnames from given names